Oscar and the Lady in Pink may refer to:

 Oscar and the Lady in Pink (novel)
 Oscar and the Lady in Pink (film), film based on the novel